The Electronics Research Center (ERC) was a NASA research facility located in Cambridge, Massachusetts, across the street from MIT at Kendall Square. The ERC opened in September 1964 as the successor to the North Eastern Operations Office which opened in July 1962. The Center took over the administration of contracts, grants, and other NASA business in New England from the North Eastern Operations Office, and was Shutdown in June 1970. Its former campus is now the site of the United States Department of Transportation's John A. Volpe National Transportation Systems Center.

Mission
The ERC served to develop the space agency's in-house expertise in electronics during the Apollo era. A second key function was to serve as a graduate and post-graduate training center within the framework of a regional government-industry-university alliance. The ERC was considered to be of equal importance as other NASA field centers such as the Langley Research Center and the Marshall Space Flight Center. By fiscal 1968, NASA planned for the ERC to be employing 1,600 professional and technical workers and 500 in administrative and support positions.

History

The Center was located in Cambridge after Massachusetts politicians unsuccessfully lobbied for the Manned Spacecraft Center. The center started its operations in Technology Square on Main Street while its campus was being built on Broadway. The location of the ERC allowed it to take advantage of the proximity to MIT, and to a lesser extent, it benefited from proximity to Harvard University, the MIT Lincoln Laboratory, the Air Force Cambridge Research Laboratories, and the electronics industry located along Massachusetts Route 128. At the time of the Center's founding, the technical, industrial, and commercial aspects of microelectronics were ascendant, especially in the Boston-Cambridge Technopolis.

Nature of research
Research at the ERC was conducted in ten different laboratories: 
space guidance systems
 computers instrumentation research
 space optics
 power conditioning and distribution
 microwave radiation
 electronics components, * qualifications and standards
 control and information systems

Researchers investigated such areas as microwave and laser communications; the miniaturization and radiation resistance of electronic components, guidance and control systems, photovoltaic energy conversion, information display devices, instrumentation, and computers and data processing.

Although no publication has investigated the nature of the research or professional training conducted at the ERC, an internal NASA publication lists a few accomplishments identified with the center, such as:
a high-frequency (30 GHz) oscillator
a miniaturized tunnel-diode transducer
a transistor more tolerant of space radiation
"One particularly interesting development," the source added, "has been in the area of holography. At the Electronics Research Center, holography has been used for data storage, and has permitted a remarkable degree of data compression in the storing of star patterns" ( Preliminary History, 1:V-11, 1:V-34 & 1:V-35). A book on holography written by one of the ERC's directors, Dr. Winston Kock, indicates some of the facility's contributions, such as Lowell Rosen's improvement of so-called focused-image holography (Kock, 80-82).

Controversy and funding
The Electronics Research Center was at the heart of political controversy from the start. President John F. Kennedy and NASA administrator James Webb kept the project out of the budget process until after Ted Kennedy's first election to the Senate. After the President belatedly put the ERC project in the budget process, Congress rebelled. In addition to Republican members, Representatives from the Midwest and other regions felt that they had been swindled out of the NASA budget. The issue split the Congress along both party and regional lines.  As a result, the ERC had the most deliberated and defended existence and siting of any NASA Center.

Although the only Center ever closed, the ERC actually grew while NASA eliminated major programs and cut staff. Between 1967 and 1970, NASA cut permanent civil service workers at all Centers with one exception, the ERC, whose personnel grew annually. Hardest hit by the cuts had been the Marshall Space Flight Center, whose future was then the subject of agency debate (Levine, 134-135).

NASA Administrator James Webb, more than any other individual, shaped the ERC. Webb saw it as fulfilling a broader mission as part of the nation's Cold War struggle on the economic and intellectual battleground of the Space Race. The ERC was an archetype for Webb's regional "university-industry-government complex" analogous to the military-industrial complex, organized because Webb believed that no single institution had the requisite resources to fight this war. The ERC's training of critically needed engineers and scientists served the same Cold War aim 

The ERC has received hardly any attention as a subject of scholarly or lay studies. No single work, neither book nor article, has been devoted to the ERC itself. The few works that consider the ERC other than in passing focus on the turbulent political circumstances surrounding its creation (Murphy, 225-264;Hechler, 219-231). A thesis written for the MIT Sloan School of Management is the only work that deals solely with the facility's closing (Rollins).

References

"Effort Embraces Spectrum from SST to Private Planes." Aerospace Technology, November 20, 1967, 21:11, 56-7.
 Hechler, Ken. Toward the Endless Frontier: History of the Committee on Scienceand Technology, 1959-1979. Washington, DC: GPO, 1980.
 
 
 
 .
"Preliminary History of the National Aeronautics and Space Administration during the Administration of President Lyndon B. Johnson: Final Edition." Manuscript. 2 vols. Washington: NASA, 1969.
Rhea, John. "ERC is Focal Point of Future Efforts." Aerospace Technology, November 20, 1967, 21:11, 53-6.
Rollins, Robert H., II. "Closing of the NASA Electronics Research Center: A Study of the Reallocation of Space Program Talent." M.S. Thesis, Alfred P. Sloan School of Management, MIT, May 1970, 106-187, in Boyd C. Myers, II. A Report on the Closing of the NASA Electronics Research Center, Cambridge, Massachusetts. Washington: NASA, October 1, 1970.
Tomayko, James E. Computers in Spaceflight: The NASA Experience. New York: M. Dekker, 1987. Also published as Computers in Space: Journeys with NASA. Indianapolis: Alpha Books, 1994.

Proceedings of ERC symposia

From the Washington: Scientific and Technical Information Division, NASA
Evaluation of Motion-Degraded Images. NASASP-193. 1969.
Future Fields of Control Application. NASA SP-211. 1969.
NASA Inter-Center Control Systems Conference. 1978.
Proceedings of the Computer-aided System Design Seminar. 1969. MIT, April 9, 1969.
Recent Advances in Display Media. NASA SP-159. 1968.
Spaceborne Multiprocessing Seminar. Cambridge: ERC, 1966.
Kennedy, Robert S., and Sherman Karp, ed. Optical Space Communication. NASA SP 217. 1969.
Mannella, Gene G., ed. Aerospace Measurement Techniques. NASA SP-132. 1967.
Thompson, William I., III. The Color of the Ocean. 1969.

External links
NASA history of the Center
American Institute of Aeronautics and Astronautics (AIAA) paper by Andrew Butrica
NASA Office of Logic Design
Works related to ERC research areas. PDF. NASA.

NASA groups, organizations, and centers
Companies based in Cambridge, Massachusetts
Research institutes established in 1964
1964 establishments in Massachusetts
1970 disestablishments in Massachusetts